Marissa Moss (born September 29, 1959, Jeannette, Pennsylvania) is an American children's book author.

Work
Moss's work spans the many ages of a child.  She started her first career making picture books.  Amelia's Notebook was her first deviation from that format.  This book is the format of a journal or diary and is penned in a black and white composition notebook.  Moss herself says that she loves this format that she stumbled upon because it allows her to explore the world through a child's eyes.  In fact, she says, "The things that happened to Amelia really happened to me--from the fire in the school to the marshmallows on the ceiling — though the names have been changed because my sister is mad enough at me already!"

Other books in this series, which traces Amelia's life through the years, are: Amelia Writes Again, Amelia Hits the Road, Amelia Takes Command, The All New Amelia, My Notebook (with help from Amelia), Luv, Amelia, Luv Nadia, Amelia's Family Ties, Amelia Works It Out!, Oh Boy, Amelia!, Amelia Lends a Hand, Amelia's Best Year Ever, Amelia's Book of Notes & Note Passing, Amelia's Sixth Grade Notebook, Dr. Amelia's Boredom Survival Guide, Madame Amelia Tells All, toddler time Amelia's Bully Survival Guide, Amelia's Guide to Gossip: The Good, the Bad, and the Ugly, Amelia's 5th-Grade Notebook, Amelia's School Survival Guide, Amelia's Most Unforgettable Embarrassing Moments and Amelia's Must-Keep Resolutions For The Best Year Ever!. Still to come in the series and slated for publication in 2007 are: The All-New Amelia, Amelia Tells All, Amelia's 7th-Grade Notebook, and Vote 4 Amelia.

She has also written several historical journals, also in diary format. These include an account of a girl's life during the depression entitled, Rose's Journal: The Story of a Girl in the Great Depression.; Rachel's Journal: The Story of a Pioneer Girl; Emma's Journal: The Story of a Colonial Girl; Hannah's Journal: The Story of an Immigrant Girl; and Galen: My Life in Imperial Rome...

Earlier in her career Marissa Moss wrote and illustrated several children's books not in journal format.  These include After School Monster, Wanna Play?, But Not Kate, Regina's Big Mistake, Mel's Diner, In America, and The Ugly Menorah, although most of these are now out of print.

Moss has also written books illustrated by C.F. Payne: True Heart, Brave Harriet: The First Woman to Fly the English Channel, and Mighty Jackie: The Strikeout Queen.

Moss illustrated G is For Google: A Math Alphabet Book, which was written by David Schwartz. She has also written the ‘Mira’s Diary’ series.

Moss has reviewed children's books with New York Journal of Books since 2017.

Personal life
Marissa Moss first submitted a book for publication at the age of nine.
She attended the University of California, Berkeley and graduated in 1979. She studied art history in graduate school for two years and then attended the California College of Arts and Crafts to study the publishing world.  She, like most artists and authors, received many rejections before finally breaking into print with her book, One, Two, Three & Four. No More? published by Houghton Mifflin in 1988.  She currently resides in the San Francisco Bay Area.

Awards

2017 
 California Young Reader Medal: Barbed Wire Baseball

2015 
 Washington State Student Award for Informational Text: Barbed Wire Baseball

2014 
 ALA Notable Book: Barbed Wire Baseball
 Museum of Tolerance Once Upon A World Children's Book Award: Barbed Wire Baseball

2013 
 California Book Award: Barbed Wire Baseball
 California Reading Association Eureka Honor Book: Barbed Wire Baseball

2012 
 California Book Award: A Soldier's Secret

2005
 Selected for the 2005-2006 Louisiana Young Readers' Choice Award Master List: Mighty Jackie: the Strike-out Queen
 Placed on the Chickadee Award Master List for 2005-2006 in the state of Maine: Mighty Jackie: the Strike-out Queen
 Selected for the 2006 Washington Children's Choice Picture Book Award Master List: Mighty Jackie: the Strike-out Queen

2001
 Sugarman Family Award for Jewish Children's Literature: Hannah's Journal
 National Parenting Publications Gold Award: Amelia's Moving Pictures (Video)
 Parent's Guide Children's Media Award: Amelia's Moving Pictures (Video)
 Parent's Guide Fiction Award: Oh Boy, Amelia

1995
 Child Study Children's Book of the Year: In America

External links 
 Official site
 Who Wrote That? Featuring Marissa Moss
 Marissa Moss Teacher Resource File
 Meet Children's Authors and Illustrators: Marissa Moss
 Scholastic Books Author Biography

References 

American children's writers
1959 births
Living people
Writers from Berkeley, California
People from Jeannette, Pennsylvania
University of California, Berkeley alumni
California College of the Arts alumni